Bedmond and Primrose Hill is a ward in Three Rivers, in England, the United Kingdom.  It is located in south-west Hertfordshire, in the East of England region.  The ward includes Bedmond and a sparsely populated area to the north.  It lies north of the M25 motorway, which separates the ward from Abbots Langley, and is bordered by Kings Langley to the west, and Hemel Hempstead to the north.  Slightly to the east of the ward is the M1 motorway.

Bedmond elects two members to Three Rivers District Council.  It is represented by two Liberal Democrat councillors (Joy Mann and Richard Laval).  For elections to Hertfordshire County Council, Bedmond and Primrose Hill is part of the Abbots Langley division, represented by the Liberal Democrat Paul Goggins.  For elections to the House of Commons, the ward is primarily in the St Albans constituency, but the southern part lies in Watford.  As of the 2010 election, the ward is entirely within the St Albans constituency.

Wards of Hertfordshire
Politics of Three Rivers District
Geography of Three Rivers District